Komornicki (feminine Komornicka) is a Polish surname. Notable people with the surname include:

 Ryszard Komornicki (born 1959), Polish footballer
 Stanisław Komornicki (1924-2010), Polish military officer

Polish-language surnames